Zachary Robin Gottsagen (born April 22, 1985) is an American actor. He had a breakout role for the film The Peanut Butter Falcon.

Career 
His screen debut happened as an infant in a 1985 instructional film on natural childbirth.

While at Zeno Mountain Farm, a camp for people with and without disabilities, Gottsagen met filmmakers Tyler Nilson and Michael Schwartz. Per Gottsagen's request for Nilson and Schwartz to make a movie with Gottsagen as the star, Nilson and Schwartz wrote and directed The Peanut Butter Falcon. In the movie Gottsagen plays the starring role as an aspiring professional wrestler with Down Syndrome.

In 2020, Gottsagen became the first person with Down Syndrome to be a presenter at the Academy Awards, when he and Shia LaBeouf presented the Academy Award for Best Live Action Short Film at the 92nd Academy Awards. In 2019, he was recognized as a Breakthrough Entertainer by the Associated Press.

Gottsagen starred with Felicity Huffman in an ABC television series based on the life of Susan Savage, owner of the minor league baseball team the Sacramento River Cats.

Filmography

Film

Awards and nominations

References

External links 
 

1985 births
21st-century American male actors
Actors with Down syndrome
American male film actors
Living people